Matilda is a 1978 American comedy film directed by Daniel Mann and starring Elliott Gould, Robert Mitchum and Lionel Stander. The screenplay by Timothy Galfas is based on the eponymous 1970 novel by Paul Gallico.

Plot
A small-time talent agent discovers an amazing boxing kangaroo and figures to use him as his stepping-stone into the big time by having him compete with a human pugilist.

Cast
Elliott Gould - Bernie Bonnelli
Clive Revill - Billy Baker
Harry Guardino - Uncle Nono
Roy Clark - Wild Bill Wildman
Karen Carlson - Kathleen Smith
Art Metrano - Gordon Baum
Lionel Stander - Pinky Schwab
Roberta Collins - Tanya Six
Larry Pennell - Lee Dockerty
Gary Morgan - Matilda
Robert Mitchum - Duke Parkhurst
Lenny Montana - Hood #1
Frank Avianca - Hood #2
Joe De Fish - Hood #3
Pat Henry - Hood #4

Production

The film was budgeted at $5.2 million. Producer Al Ruddy explained that "we debated over using both a real kangaroo and an actor in costume and opted for the latter as cross-cutting proved too jarring for the viewer. However the costume was a $30,000 investment that paid off as it not only allowed freedom of movement, but we were able to program it with transistors to allow us to direct the actor's tiniest gesture." Critic Tom Allen wrote in The Village Voice that "Matilda is worked by a person in a fur suit and fixed mask. ... The technicians do not even get the ears to wiggle and the mouth to pucker until the final minutes."

Gould said "Al Ruddy wanted to buy back my position, my points in the picture, he offered me hundreds of thousands of dollars, which at that point I decided would be bad karma. That was bad judgment on my part.”

Half the budget was provided by Melvin Simon Productions. TV rights were sold to CBS for $2.5 million, foreign sales were $1.6 million and AIP paid an advance of $1.8 million. This added up to $5.9 million meaning Simon made a profit of $450,000.

Soundtrack
"When I'm with You, I'm Feelin' Good" - Music by Carol Connors, Lyrics by Ernie Shelton, Sung by Pat Boone & Debby Boone, Record Produced by Mike Curb
"Waltzing Matilda" - (uncredited), Lyrics by A.B. 'Banjo' Paterson, Music by Christina Macpherson

Notes

List of American films of 1978

External links

 
 
 

1978 films
1970s sports comedy films
American boxing films
American sports comedy films
American International Pictures films
Films about kangaroos and wallabies
Films about animals playing sports
Films based on works by Paul Gallico
1978 comedy films
1970s English-language films
1970s American films